The Will of King Afonso II is among the oldest known documents written in Galician-Portuguese. It was written in Coimbra and is dated June 27, 1214.

It has reached our days through two manuscripts, one of which was sent to the Archbishop of Braga and is currently in the Torre do Tombo National Archives.

Dating and historical importance
The will of Afonso II, drawn up on June 27, 1214, is the document most often mentioned and celebrated as the first text written in Portuguese.

There are several possibly older manuscripts (most, however, with imprecise dating) that already show many of the characteristics of what would come to be considered a Romance language different from Latin, such as the "Pact of the Pais brothers" (ca. 1175) and Noticia de Torto (ca. 1214).

However, the royal nature of the document and the fact that it has an indisputable dating unlike other surviving documents of the time, and that it is indisputably written in a language other than Latin, makes it a point of reference of greater importance for language dating. Thus, in the year 2014, in the eighth-hundredth anniversary of the document, the anniversary of the Portuguese language was also celebrated, though some scholars pointed out that the language was already spoken prior to that date.

It was only in 1536 with the publication of Grammatica da Lingoagem Portuguesa by Fernão de Oliveira that the language entered its mature or modern phase.

Excerpt

References

Portuguese language
Galician-Portuguese
History of the Portuguese language
Medieval Portugal
13th century in Portugal
Portuguese literature